Jnan Chandra Ghosh Polytechnic is a polytechnic college located in Mayurbhanj Road in Kolkata, West Bengal. The institute was established in 1959 and was named after Sir Jnan Chandra Ghosh, an eminent chemist and the first director of Indian Institute of Technology Kharagpur. This polytechnic is affiliated with West Bengal State Council of Technical Education.

Departments
This polytechnic offers Diplomas in Engineering in the following streams:
 Civil Engineering
 Mechanical Engineering
 Electrical Engineering
 Electronics & Telecommunication Engineering
 Pharmacy

The courses offered by the institute are approved by All India Council for Technical Education.

References

External links
 

Universities and colleges in Kolkata
Educational institutions established in 1959
1959 establishments in West Bengal
Technical universities and colleges in West Bengal